The handball events at the 1978 All-Africa Games were held in Algiers, Algeria from 13 to 28 July 1978. The competition included for the first time the women's tournament while the men's tournament is played for the third time.

Events

Men's tournament 

Final standing is:

Women's tournament 

Final standing is:

References

 
Handball at the African Games
All-Africa Games
1978 in African handball